Zavattarello is a comune (municipality) in the Province of Pavia in the Italian region Lombardy, located about 70 km south of Milan and about 35 km south of Pavia.

Zavattarello borders the following municipalities: Alta Val Tidone, Menconico, Romagnese, Ruino, Valverde, Varzi.

The main sights is the castle, also known as Castello Del Verme, which overlooks the town. It once housed the war school of Italian Renaissance condottiero Jacopo Dal Verme.

References

Cities and towns in Lombardy